Chuang Chia-jung and Zhang Shuai were the defending champions, but decided not to participate.

Chan Hao-ching and Kristina Mladenovic won the title, defeating Darija Jurak and Katalin Marosi in the final, 7–6(7–3), 6–2.

Seeds 

  Raquel Kops-Jones /  Abigail Spears (semifinals)
  Chan Hao-ching /  Kristina Mladenovic (champions)
  Natalie Grandin /  Vladimíra Uhlířová (first round)
  Darija Jurak /  Katalin Marosi (final)

Draw

References 
 Draw

Portugal Open - Doubles
Women's Doubles